Ramón Rodríguez Granada was a Mexican art director. He designed the sets for more than two hundred films during his career.

Selected filmography
 The Eternal Secret (1942)
 Beautiful Michoacán (1943)
 Opium (1949)
 Autumn and Spring (1949)
 The Lost City (1950)
 Serenade in Acapulco (1951)
 The Unknown Mariachi (1953)

References

Bibliography
 Aaker, Everett. George Raft: The Films. McFarland, 2013.

External links

Year of birth unknown
Year of death unknown
Mexican art directors